Jacob John Lansing was an American who served as Sheriff of New York County.

Career
Lansing was appointed Sheriff of New York County on September 29, 1795, to succeed Marinus Willett. He was removed from office on December 28, 1798 "on account of his politics" during the administration of Gov. John Jay, and was succeeded by James Morriss.

See also
New York City Sheriff's Office

References

External links
From Alexander Hamilton to Richard Hartshorne, [23 March 1803]

Year of birth missing
Date of death missing
American people of Dutch descent
American people of English descent
People of the Province of New York
Sheriffs of New York County, New York